The US 190 Bridge at the Neches River, near Jasper, Texas, was built in 1941.  It brings U.S. Route 190 across the Neches River, between Jasper County, Texas and Tyler County, Texas.  It was listed on the National Register of Historic Places in 1996.

It is a Parker through truss bridge designed by the Texas Highway Department.  It was fabricated by the Virginia Bridge Company of Roanoke, Virginia and was built by the Gaylord Construction Company of Houston.

See also

National Register of Historic Places listings in Jasper County, Texas

References

Bridges in Texas
National Register of Historic Places in Jasper County, Texas
Infrastructure completed in 1941
Bridges of the United States Numbered Highway System